Warren T. Hope was an American poet and university professor.

Biography
Hope (1944-2022) was born in Philadelphia, Pennsylvania, and educated in the public schools there. After graduating from Philadelphia's Central High School, Hope served in the United States Air Force, and then attended the Community College of Philadelphia. Hope eventually received a BA, MA, and Ph.D. in English from Temple University. He has worked as a printer, a warehouseman, and an editor, eventually working at the Insurance Institute of America and the American Institute for Property and Liability Underwriters in Malvern, Pa. in publishing and public relations.

Hope is the author of several books, including Adam's Thoughts in Winter (2001), which includes a selection of poems from the years 1970 to 2000, and Moving In (2004), wherein Hope details his life experiences in poetic form. He is also the biographer of Norman Cameron, the British poet, and the author of critical studies of Robert Frost, Seamus Heaney, Philip Larkin, and George Orwell, all published by Greenwich Exchange of London, England. He is the author, with Kim Holston, of The Shakespeare Controversy, published by McFarland & Company in 1992, and has published articles and reviews in several periodicals.

References

Bibliography
Adam's Thoughts in Winter (2001) 
"First Light & Other Poems" (2013) 
"George Orwell"(2007)
"A Movement of Minds: Nine American Poets of the Late Nineteenth Century"(2019) 
Moving In (2004) 
"Norman Cameron: His Life, Work, and Letters" (2000) 
"Philip Larkin"(1997) 
"Robert Frost" (2004) 
"Seamus Heaney"(2002) 

1944 births
American academics of English literature
American male poets
Community College of Philadelphia alumni
Living people
Temple University alumni
University of the Sciences faculty
Writers from Philadelphia
20th-century American poets
20th-century American male writers
20th-century American non-fiction writers
American male non-fiction writers